Kadota may refer to:
 Kadota, California, an unincorporated community
 9751 Kadota, a main-belt asteroid
 Hiromitsu Kadota (born 1948), a Japanese baseball player
 a common fig cultivar